Empresa Nacional de Electricidade de Angola (E.N.E.) was a state-owned electricity company of Angola. The company was closed in 2014 per presidential decree no. 305/14. 

The decree created three new companies instead, i.e. Empresa Nacional de Distribuição de Electricidade (ENDE), Empresa Pública de Produção de Electricidade (PRODEL-EP), and Empresa Rede Nacional de Transporte de Electricidade (RNT-EP).

References

External links

 Company website

Electric power companies of Angola